KCWI-TV (channel 23) is a television station licensed to Ames, Iowa, United States, serving as the CW affiliate for the Des Moines area. It is owned by Tegna Inc. alongside ABC affiliate WOI-DT (channel 5), also licensed to Ames. Both stations share studios on Westown Parkway in West Des Moines, while KCWI-TV's transmitter is located in Alleman, Iowa.

History

As a WB affiliate
Channel 23 first signed on the air on January 20, 2001 under the callsign KPWB-TV (the KPWB calls were originally used by KMAX-TV in Sacramento, California during that station's 1995 to 1998 tenure as a WB affiliate under Pappas Telecasting ownership, before later becoming a UPN owned-and-operated station and then joining The CW). The station originally maintained a primary affiliation with The WB and a secondary affiliation with UPN. KPWB dropped UPN programming in 2003, carrying the full WB prime time and Kids' WB lineups during the remainder of the station's tenure with the network. Prior to the station's launch, this area had been without programming from The WB; from 1995 to 1999, The WB programming was available on Des Moines–Ames cable systems via the former superstation feed of WGN-TV in Chicago.

As a CW affiliate
On January 24, 2006, Time Warner and CBS Corporation announced the shutdowns of The WB and UPN effective that September. In place of these networks, both companies decided to form The CW, a new service that combined the most popular programming from both UPN and The WB with new series produced specifically for the network. Just over one month later on February 22, 2006, News Corporation announced that it would start up MyNetworkTV, a sister network to Fox, which would be operated as a joint venture between Fox Television Stations and Twentieth Television. MyNetworkTV was created in order to give UPN and WB-affiliated stations that were not selected to join The CW another option besides becoming an independent station.

It seemed very likely that KPWB would become The CW's Des Moines affiliate, as NBC affiliate WHO-TV (channel 13) had a secondary affiliation with UPN. On March 16, 2006, Pappas Telecasting signed an affiliation agreement to make KPWB the market's CW affiliate. A few months later, MyNetworkTV announced that it would affiliate with a new station also owned by Pappas, KDMI (then on channel 56), which began broadcasting that network on September 5, 2006. On September 18, 2006, the date that The CW officially launched, KPWB changed its call letters to KCWI-TV to reflect its new affiliation. In 2013, the station's logo switched from the generic version that The CW had used since its inception to a version utilizing the station's call letters (this version is also being used by The CW's San Francisco O&O, KBCW-TV).

After MyNetworkTV converted to a programming service in September 2009, KDMI dropped the affiliation in favor of joining This TV. WWE SmackDown, which aired on MyNetworkTV at the time, moved to KCWI airing in a Saturday primetime slot; the station stopped airing the show on September 11, 2010, three weeks before the agreement to carry the show ended with the October 2010 move of SmackDown to Syfy. As a result of KDMI dropping the MyNetworkTV affiliation, Des Moines was the largest Nielsen media market without an over-the-air affiliate of the service until KDMI rejoined MyNetworkTV on October 3, 2011, though that station began carrying the service's programming four hours later than most MyNetworkTV affiliates upon rejoining the service (Nexstar Broadcasting Group–owned WLMT in Memphis also aired SmackDown in a manner very similar to KCWI after MyNetworkTV's original Memphis affiliate WPXX-TV dropped the programming service; WLMT's second digital subchannel eventually affiliated with the service after SmackDown moved to Syfy).

On October 24, 2014, Pappas reached a deal to sell KCWI-TV to Nexstar Broadcasting Group for $3.5 million. The deal separated the station from KDMI, but created a new duopoly with ABC affiliate WOI-DT (channel 5), by coincidence also licensed to Ames. Shortly after the sale was announced, Harry and Stella Pappas sued to block the deal, arguing that the price undervalued KCWI. The deal was approved by the FCC on December 19, 2014, but the completion of the deal was placed on hold due to the lawsuit. The sale was formally completed on March 14, 2016, with Nexstar announcing shortly after that KCWI would leave its downtown Des Moines studios and consolidate operations with WOI at that station's West Des Moines facilities as of April 1.

On December 3, 2018, Nexstar announced it would acquire the assets of Chicago-based Tribune Media—which has owned NBC affiliate WHO-DT (channel 13) since December 2013—for $6.4 billion in cash and debt. Nexstar is precluded from acquiring WHO-DT directly or indirectly, as FCC regulations prohibit common ownership of more than two stations in the same media market, or two or more of the four highest-rated stations in the market. (Furthermore, any attempt by Nexstar to assume the operations of WHO-DT through local marketing or shared services agreements may be subject to regulatory hurdles that could delay completion of the FCC and Justice Department's review and approval process for the acquisition.) As such, Nexstar will be required to sell either WHO-DT or WOI-DT to a separate, unrelated company to address the ownership conflict. (As KCWI does not rank among the top four in total-day viewership and therefore is not in conflict with existing FCC in-market ownership rules, that station optionally can be retained by Nexstar regardless of whether it chooses to retain ownership of WOI or sell WOI in order to acquire WHO or, should it be divested, be sold to the prospective buyer of WOI.)

On March 20, 2019, McLean, Virginia–based Tegna Inc. announced it would purchase WOI and KCWI from Nexstar upon consummation of the merger, as part of the company's sale of nineteen Nexstar- and Tribune-operated stations to Tegna and the E. W. Scripps Company in separate deals worth $1.32 billion; the WOI–KCWI duopoly, along with Moline, Illinois sister station WQAD-TV (which Nexstar, on behalf of Tribune, also plans to divest to Tegna as part of the spin-offs), would mark Tegna's first television properties to serve Iowa. The sale was completed on September 19, 2019.

Programming
In addition to CW network programming, syndicated programs seen on KCWI include Family Guy, The King of Queens and Modern Family. The station also aired select Chicago Cubs baseball games which were carried by WGN beginning in the 2016 season.

Since KCWI is a sister station to WOI, it is responsible for airing ABC programming when WOI is unable to or otherwise chooses not to air a program due to weather/emergency updates or local specials.

On August 24, 2016, KCWI launched an affiliation with Escape on its DT2 subchannel and Bounce on its DT3 subchannel.

During its time as KPWB, the station carried St. Louis Cardinals baseball games syndicated from KPLR-TV.

Newscasts

KCWI presently broadcasts a total of 18½ hours of local newscasts each week (a three-hour local weekday morning newscast from 7 to 10 a.m. and a nightly half hour newscast at 9 p.m.). KCWI did not broadcast any news programming until April 2012, when the station debuted a three-hour morning news and interview show called Great Day on KCWI, now airing four hours Monday-Fridays from 6 to 10 a.m. since September 2013. In addition to news, weather, sports and traffic reports, Great Day features guest interviews, animal segments, comedians, music and various videos. The station did not previously offer a primetime newscast following CW network programming, with syndicated sitcom reruns airing instead during the 9 p.m. timeslot. When Nexstar completed its sale of the station, the show's name was changed to The KCWI23-HD Morning Show.

On April 11, 2016, KCWI's morning show was changed once again, this time to CW Iowa Live airing from 7 to 10 a.m. with the 6 a.m. hour now being occupied by infomercials to avoid competition with WOI-DT's morning show. The newly revamped show retained Michelle Brown and Lou Sipolt, but meteorologist Jason Parkin was let go as a result of the changes made; the show also retains the variety show feel of Great Day with some local segments by WOI's news team. The following week, on April 18, KCWI began airing a nightly half-hour 9 p.m. newscast also produced by WOI and also competes against the WHO-DT produced newscast on Fox affiliate KDSM-TV and KCCI's half-hour newscast that it airs on its MeTV subchannel.

Technical information

Subchannels
The station's digital signal is multiplexed:

In February 2020, a fifth subchannel of KCWI-TV was launched as a UHF simulcast of WOI-DT in order to alleviate reception issues with WOI's channel 5 VHF signal.

Analog-to-digital conversion
KCWI-TV shut down its analog signal, over UHF channel 23, on June 12, 2009, and "flash-cut" its digital signal into operation UHF channel 23. Because it was granted an original construction permit after the Federal Communications Commission finalized the DTV allotment plan on April 21, 1997, the station did not receive a companion channel for a digital television station. Due to this abnormality, the station's digital signal was carried as a subchannel of now former sister station KDMI.

References

External links
WeAreIowa.com - WOI-DT/KCWI-TV official website

The CW affiliates
Bounce TV affiliates
Quest (American TV network) affiliates
GetTV affiliates
2001 establishments in Iowa
Television channels and stations established in 2001
Television stations in Des Moines, Iowa
Tegna Inc.